Cherry Creek is a large, swift-flowing  stream in the Sierra Nevada mountain range, and is the largest tributary of the Tuolumne River. Part of the drainage also extends into the northwest corner of Yosemite National Park.

Geography
It flows west then southwest through the rugged granite formations of the deep Cherry Creek Canyon. After joining with West Fork Cherry Creek, it flows south into Cherry Lake, a large reservoir formed by the Cherry Valley Dam.

It is located north of, and flows largely parallel to the East Fork. Below Emigrant Lake it flows through Cow Meadow Lake and then continues through a canyon to its confluence with the East Fork.

It turns southwest, receiving the larger Buck Meadow Creek from the left and then Piute Creek from the right.

Eleanor Creek begins at the confluence of Bartlett and Kendrick Creeks inside Yosemite National Park and flows into Lake Eleanor, a natural lake enlarged by the Lake Eleanor Dam. Below the dam it flows through a short, steep canyon before its confluence with Cherry Creek.

River modifications
The Cherry Creek watershed has a long history of development for hydroelectric power, water supply and flood control. The first dam in the Cherry Creek watershed was the multiple-arch Lake Eleanor Dam, built in 1918 as part of the Hetch Hetchy Project which provides water and power to the city of San Francisco. Although the actual source of the water supply is from the Hetch Hetchy Reservoir on the Tuolumne River, the dam at Lake Eleanor provided the electric power needed for construction work at O'Shaughnessy Dam and the Hetch Hetchy Aqueduct, and also for the construction of Cherry Valley Dam 30 years later. The first power at Early Intake Powerhouse was generated on May 6, 1918.

Construction on Cherry Valley Dam, which dams the main Cherry Creek to form Cherry Lake, began in August 1953 and was completed in October 1955. It provides drinking water and flood control for communities in the Central Valley, and generates hydroelectricity at the Dion R. Holm Powerhouse (originally named Cherry Powerhouse), which began operation on August 1, 1960, superseding the Early Intake Powerhouses.

Ecology
Cherry Creek is home to both native and introduced fish species. Brown bullhead, brown trout and golden shiner are present both above and below Cherry Lake. The upper part of Cherry Creek has wild brook trout, and green sunfish are present in the lower creek. Before the damming of the Tuolumne River in the early 20th century, the creek also had annual runs of chinook salmon and steelhead trout.

Recreation
At its headwaters, Cherry Creek flows through granite valleys similar to those found in Yosemite Valley, though these areas are accessible only to backpackers.

Whitewater rafting on portions of Cherry Creek is classed in the very difficult Class V/V+ category and has been called by one commentator "without a doubt the most difficult commercially run river in the country."

See also
List of rivers of California

References

Tuolumne River
Rivers of Tuolumne County, California
Rivers of the Sierra Nevada (United States)
Tributaries of the San Joaquin River
Stanislaus National Forest
Rivers of Northern California
Rivers of the Sierra Nevada in California